An Arraiolos rug, Arraiolos tapestry, Arraiolos carpet or Portuguese needlework rug (in Portuguese, Tapete de Arraiolos) is an embroidered wool rug made traditionally in the small town of Arraiolos, Portugal, since the Middle Ages. They are partly inspired by Persian carpets.

References and sources
References

Sources
BAPTISTA DE OLIVEIRA, Fernando. 1992 "Tapeçarias Decorativas de Arraiolos".

Rugs and carpets
Portuguese culture
Arraiolos
Embroidery